On November 3, 2020, a mass shooting occurred at the Douglas at Stonelake Apartments in Henderson, Nevada, United States. 38-year-old Jason Neo Bourne, who lived at the apartments, shot several of his neighbors, killing two, wounding one, and taking one hostage. Bourne was later shot and killed by responding police officers when he threatened the hostage in his car.

Shooting
Around 11:00 a.m. PST, a gunman forcibly entered his neighbor's apartment at the Douglas at Stonelake Apartments and shot three people with a handgun, killing two and wounding one; the shooter also kidnapped a 12-year-old-boy. Police quickly arrived at the complex after an emergency call reporting gunfire. While the officers searched for the gunman, he called police dispatchers, rambling incoherently, referring to himself as "Bane" and demanding a helicopter. Police found the gunman in a Cadillac Escalade with the boy he had taken hostage. After attempts to de-escalate the situation police allege the gunman put his weapon to the boy's head, causing police to open fire on the vehicle. The gunman and the boy were killed. Police believe that the shooter was killed by police gunfire, and police allege the boy was shot by the gunman. The shooting was recorded by officers' body cameras.

Victims
The victims were identified as 38-year-old Dianne Hawatmeh, her 12-year-old son Joseph, and 33-year-old Veronica Muniz, the Hawatmeh's housekeeper. 16-year-old Yasmeen Hawatmeh, Dianne's daughter, was critically injured.  

In 2022 the father of Joseph Hawatmeh filed a federal lawsuit against the Henderson Police Department accusing police of firing the shots that killed Joseph.

Perpetrator
The gunman was identified by police as 38-year-old Jason Neo Bourne, who lived in an apartment above the Hawatmeh family. The gunman had legally changed his name to Jason Neo Bourne, possibly in reference to the character Jason Bourne and Neo (The Matrix). No known motive has been established.

See also
 List of mass shootings in the United States in 2020

References

2020 in Nevada
2020 mass shootings in the United States
2020 murders in the United States
History of Henderson, Nevada
Attacks on buildings and structures in 2020
Attacks on buildings and structures in the United States
November 2020 crimes in the United States
Mass shootings in Nevada
Murder in Nevada
Deaths by firearm in Nevada
Filmed killings by law enforcement
Violence against women in the United States
Filmed deaths in the United States
Hostage taking in the United States
Mass shootings in the United States